The 1976–77 London Spartan League season was the 59th in the history of Spartan League, and the 2nd as London Spartan League. The league consisted of 31 teams.

Division One

The division featured 16 teams, 12 from last season and 4 new teams, all promoted from last season's Division Two:
 BROB Barnet
 Frimley Green
 Highfield
 Virginia Water

League table

Division Two

The division featured 15 teams, 11 from last season and 4 new teams:
 Penhill Standard, relegated from last season's Division One
 Fisher Athletic
 Welling United
 Policrom

Finishing positions only is known.

League table

References

1976–77
9